Air Force Global Strike Command (AFGSC) is a Major Command (MAJCOM) of the United States Air Force, headquartered at Barksdale Air Force Base, Louisiana. AFGSC provides combat-ready forces to conduct strategic nuclear deterrence and global strike operations in support of combatant commanders. Air Force Global Strike Command is the Air Force's service component to the United States Strategic Command (USSTRATCOM).

Air Force Global Strike Command is the direct descendant unit of the Cold War–era Strategic Air Command (SAC). It holds the lineage, history and honors of SAC.

History
 See: Strategic Air Command for history prior to 2009

Following the 2007 United States Air Force nuclear weapons incident when six AGM-129 Air-Launched Cruise Missiles (ALCM), each loaded with a W80-1 variable yield nuclear warhead, were mistakenly loaded onto a B-52H at Minot AFB and transported to Barksdale AFB, and the 2008 incident in which four MK-12 forward-section reentry vehicle assemblies were mistakenly shipped to Taiwan, former Secretary of Defense James R. Schlesinger led an investigation into the status of U.S. Air Force nuclear surety. Secretary Schlesinger's recommendation was the creation of a single major command under which all Air Force nuclear assets should be placed for better accountability. On 24 October 2008, the Secretary of the United States Air Force, Michael Donley, announced the creation of the Air Force Global Strike Command (AFGSC) as a new Air Force major command (MAJCOM). The AFGSC is the only remaining Air Force component command reporting to the United States Strategic Command (USSTRATCOM) at Offutt.

The new command began operations in August 2009, combining the nuclear-capable strategic bomber force previously operated by Air Combat Command (ACC) and the land-based intercontinental ballistic missile (ICBM) force previously operated by Air Force Space Command (AFSPC). ACC and AFSPC had assumed said responsibilities following the 1992 inactivation of Strategic Air Command (SAC).

The USAF currently has 20 B-2 Spirit, 57 B-52 Stratofortress bombers, and three missile wings of Minuteman III ICBMs that are designated as nuclear-capable. When needed for conventional missions, the B-2, and B-52 bombers will be reassigned to regional commands. Although formerly assigned a nuclear mission, the Rockwell B-1 Lancer bomber force transitioned to a strictly conventional mission force. The B-1 was initially retained in Air Combat Command, although that decision was reversed in 2015. The Rockwell B-1 Lancer bombers now are organized under the Air Force Global Strike Command.

In November 2008, the USAF announced plans to start a fourth B-52 squadron at Minot Air Force Base to support Air Force Global Strike Command. The USAF added that, "all the nuclear-capable bombers of what is now Eighth Air Force, and [command of all ICBMs] of what is now in Twentieth Air Force, will report to this single new command.". This action was accomplished on 3 September 2009, when the 69th Bomb Squadron reactivated at Minot Air Force Base.

The command's 55-member preliminary team, commanded by Major General James Kowalski, began operations at Bolling Air Force Base on 12 January 2009. The team was charged with finding a location for the new headquarters, and for transitioning the assigned units into the new command.

In April 2009, the preliminary team selected Barksdale Air Force Base as the headquarters for the new command. Donley stated that the factors which contributed to the selection of Barksdale over the other candidate bases were its connection to the 8th Air Force, a "slightly larger [air] operations center", and the base's hosting of the 11th Bomb Squadron, which trains B-52 aircrews and will be adding special emphasis on nuclear training.

On 16 April 2009, United States Secretary of Defense Robert Gates announced that Air Force Lieutenant General Frank G. Klotz was nominated to be the first commander of the Global Strike Command. Prior to his assignment to AFGSC, Lt Gen Klotz was the Assistant Vice Chief of Staff and Director of the Air Force Staff.

On 18 June, after an environmental assessment finding of "No Significant Impact", Barksdale Air Force Base was announced as the permanent location for AFGSC. On 7 August 2009, the command officially became active with Lt. Gen. Klotz assuming command of the organization. The headquarters staff includes 900 people, and reached full operational capability by 30 September 2010.

The Twentieth Air Force, the service's missile organization, came under the new command on 1 December 2009, and the Eighth Air Force, the bomber component, came under the command on 1 February 2010.

Role and operations

Air Force Global Strike Command was established for the improvement of the management of the USAF portion of the United States' nuclear arsenal, which accounts for two-thirds of America's nuclear deterrent. It assumed responsibility for the nuclear-capable assets of Air Force Space Command on 1 December 2009 and the nuclear-capable assets of Air Combat Command on 1 February 2010.

The creation of Air Force Global Strike Command was outlined in the recommendations of the investigation following the 2007 United States Air Force nuclear weapons incident. The command was activated 7 August 2009, at Barksdale Air Force Base, Louisiana.

The mission of Air Force Global Strike Command is to "Develop and provide combat-ready forces for nuclear deterrence and global strike operations --Safe --Secure --Effective to support the President of the United States and combatant commanders." The command has a worldwide area of responsibility (AOR) as a subordinate component command of United States Strategic Command.

AFGSC consists of over 31,000 personnel assigned to nine wings, two geographically-separated squadrons and one detachment in the continental United States and deployed to locations around the globe.

Changes to the AFGSC units began with the announcement of the 377th Air Base Wing's realignment in December 2014. In mid-April 2015, Air Force Times reported that "B-1 bombers from Ellsworth Air Force Base in South Dakota and Dyess Air Force Base in Texas [will be] joining their long-range B-2 and B-52 bomber counterparts under a single Air Force command as part of a leadership shift announced Monday." This means that two bomb wings formerly under Air Combat Command will shift into AFGSC. The units came under the command on 1 October 2015. On 6 October 2016, the 595th Command and Control Group was activated at Offutt Air Force Base, Nebraska to assume the responsibility for the Boeing E-4 NAOC mission.

Strategic bombers 

Eighth Air Force is designated as U.S. Strategic Command's Task Force 204 (TF 204), providing on-alert, combat-ready forces to the President of the United States. The mission of "The Mighty Eighth" is to safeguard America's interests through strategic deterrence and global combat power. Eighth Air Force controls long-range nuclear-capable bomber assets throughout the United States and overseas locations. Its flexible, conventional and nuclear deterrence mission provides the capability to deploy forces and engage enemy threats from home station or forward positioned, anywhere, any time. The 8th Air Force motto is "Deterrence through strength, global strike on demand." Offensive aircraft assets include the Northrop Grumman B-2 Spirit, Boeing B-52 Stratofortress, and Boeing B-1B Lancer.

The Missouri Air National Guard's 131st Bomb Wing is an associate unit of the 509th Bomb Wing at Whiteman AFB, flying the B-2A Spirit. If federalized, it is gained by Eighth Air Force. The Air Force Reserve Command's 307th Bomb Wing is an associate unit of the 2nd Bomb Wing at Barksdale AFB, flying the B-52H Stratofortress. In addition, it's geographically separated 489th Bomb Group is an associate unit of the 7th Bomb Wing at Dyess AFB, flying the B-1B Lancer. If activated, it is gained by Eighth Air Force.

Intercontinental ballistic missiles 

Twentieth Air Force is responsible for maintaining and operating the Air Force's intercontinental ballistic missile force. Designated as USSTRATCOM's Task Force 214 (TF 214), 20th Air Force provides on-alert, combat-ready ICBMs to the President of the United States. The ICBMs are on 24-hour/365-day alert and are ready to launch on any given day.

AFGSC's Twentieth Air Force is the Air Force's lead command for and largest operator of UH-1N Huey helicopters. The UH-1N supports ICBM operations in missile fields controlled by F.E. Warren, Malmstrom and Minot Air Force Bases. In 2015, the 582d Helicopter Group was activated to supervise the three UH-1 squadrons. The Huey will be replaced by the Grey Wolf.

Component units
Air Force Global Strike Command comprises the following wings and major units.

 Headquarters Air Force Global Strike Command (Barksdale AFB, Louisiana)

Eighth Air Force 

 Headquarters Eighth Air Force (Barksdale AFB)
 2nd Bomb Wing (Barksdale AFB) – B-52H Stratofortress
 11th Bomb Squadron
 20th Bomb Squadron
 96th Bomb Squadron
 5th Bomb Wing (Minot AFB, North Dakota) – B-52H Stratofortress
 23rd Bomb Squadron
 69th Bomb Squadron
 7th Bomb Wing (Dyess AFB, Texas) – B-1B Lancer
 9th Bomb Squadron
 28th Bomb Squadron
 28th Bomb Wing (Ellsworth AFB, South Dakota) – B-1B Lancer
 34th Bomb Squadron
 37th Bomb Squadron
 509th Bomb Wing (Whiteman AFB, Missouri) – B-2A Spirit
 13th Bomb Squadron
 393rd Bomb Squadron
 595th Command and Control Group (Offut AFB, Nebraska)
 1st Airborne Command Control Squadron – E-4B Advanced Airborne Command Post
 595th Aircraft Maintenance Squadron
 595th Strategic Communications Squadron
 625th Strategic Operations Squadron
 608th Air Operations Center (Barksdale AFB)

Twentieth Air Force 

 Headquarters Twentieth Air Force (Francis E. Warren AFB, Wyoming)
 90th Missile Wing (Francis E. Warren AFB) – LGM-30G Minuteman-III
 319th Missile Squadron
 320th Missile Squadron
 321st Missile Squadron
 91st Missile Wing (Minot AFB) – LGM-30G Minuteman-III
 740th Missile Squadron
 741st Missile Squadron
 742nd Missile Squadron
 341st Missile Wing (Malmstrom AFB, Montana) – LGM-30G Minuteman-III
 10th Missile Squadron
 12th Missile Squadron
 490th Missile Squadron
 377th Air Base Wing (Kirtland AFB, New Mexico)
 576th Flight Test Squadron (Vandenberg SFB, California)
 582nd Helicopter Group (Francis E. Warren AFB) – UH-1N Iroquois
 620th Ground Combat Training Squadron (Camp Guernsey, Wyoming)

Air reserve 
Air Force Global Strike Command has operational "gaining command" responsibility for several Air Reserve Component (ARC) units, comprising personnel and aircraft from Air Force Reserve Command (AFRC) and the Air National Guard (ANG).

Air Force Reserve Command

 307th Bomb Wing (Barksdale AFB)
 307th Operations Group (Barksdale AFB)
 93d Bomb Squadron – B-52H Stratofortress
 343d Bomb Squadron – B-52H Stratofortress
 489th Bomb Group (Dyess AFB)
 345th Bomb Squadron – B-1B Lancer

Missouri Air National Guard
 131st Bomb Wing (Whiteman AFB)
 131st Operations Group (Whiteman AFB)
 110th Bomb Squadron – B-2A Spirit

Other units 

 Air Operations Group (Otis ANGB, Massachusetts)
 USAF Nuclear Command, Control and Communications Center (Barksdale AFB)

List of commanders

Lineage
 Established as Continental Air Forces on 13 December 1944
 Activated on 15 December 1944
 Redesignated: Strategic Air Command on 21 March 1946
 Inactivated on 1 June 1992
 Redesignated as Air Force Global Strike Command, and activated, on 7 August 2009

Assignments
 United States Army Air Forces, 15 December 1944
 United States Air Force, 26 September 1947 – 1 June 1992
 United States Air Force, 7 August 2009–present.

Stations
 Washington, District of Columbia, 15 December 1944
 Bolling Air Force Base, District of Columbia, by 1946
 Andrews Air Force Base, Maryland, 21 October 1946
 Offutt Air Force Base, Nebraska, 9 November 1948 – 1 June 1992
 Barksdale Air Force Base, Louisiana, 7 August 2009–present

Aircraft and missiles
 Northrop Grumman B-2 Spirit (2009–present)
 Boeing B-52H Stratofortress (2009–present)
 Bell UH-1N Twin Huey (2009–present)
 LGM-30G Minuteman III (2009–present)
 B-1B Lancer (2015–present)
 Boeing E-4B (2016–present)
 Boeing MH-139A Grey Wolf (2019–present)

See also

 Nuclear triad
 List of states with nuclear weapons
Comparable organizations
United States Fleet Forces Command (U.S. Navy)

References

External links

 Official Website
 Air Force Global Strike Command (unclassified briefing), Lt Gen James M. Kowalski, 7 May 2013
 "Air Force Global Strike Command activated" – GlobalSecurity.org

Major commands of the United States Air Force
Bombardment units and formations of the United States Air Force
Military globalization
Military units and formations established in 2009
United States nuclear command and control
2009 establishments in the United States
Strategic forces
United States Strategic Command